The National League (also known as Red Bull National League) is a club-level association football competition in Nepal. The champions secured qualification to a continental cup, previously the AFC President's Cup (now AFC Cup). It took place for two seasons in 2011–12 and 2015. In other years the Martyr's Memorial A-Division League was and still is the highest level league in Nepal, together with franchise based Nepal Super League.

Due to the April 2015 Nepal earthquake, the 2015 season was halted for several mothns, before professional level football was paused in Nepal due to the earthquake's aftermath, until the next season of the 2018–19 Martyr's Memorial A-Division League.

History
The first season of National League was played in a single round-robin format in the first season in a single venue. The top eight teams from the 2011 A-Division League were joined by two invitational teams from outside the Kathmandu Valley. A-Division champions Nepal Police Club won the league undefeated and became the inaugural National League champions.

The second season was played after a hiatus of three years in a double round-robin format with teams playing home and away. The top 10 teams from the 2013-14 A-Division League were joined by four teams from outside the Kathmandu Valley. Sankata BSC pulled out of the tournament and Machhindra, Himalayan Sherpa Club, Saraswati Youth Club and Friends Club were banned by ANFA and the league was played by nine teams. The 2015 season of the League was heavily affected by the April 2015 Nepal earthquake, with play being suspended for several months. Three Star Club won the league winning their first National League title.

The third season of the National League was scheduled to be played in April 2020 but was postponed due to the COVID-19 pandemic. The top six teams from the 2019-20 A-Division League will be joined by the top four teams from the ANFA President's League in the ten team league.

Clubs

Current clubs

Former clubs

Champions

National League clubs in Asia 

The All Nepal Football Association failed to register Three Star Club by the competition deadline for the qualifying play-offs.

Lower levels

Second Tier
In its initial season, Nepal National League also hosted a second division, 2012 B-Division National League made up with the 2011 Martyr's Memorial B-Division Leagues top six teams and two teams that qualified through a separate qualification tournament.

Third Tier
In its initial season, Nepal National League also hosted a third division, 2012 C-Division National League made up with the 2011 Martyr's Memorial C-Division Leagues top four teams and two teams that qualified through a separate qualification tournament.

See also 
 Martyr's Memorial A-Division League
 Nepal Super League

References

External links
RSSSF.com - Nepal - List of Champions and Cup Winners

 
Top level football leagues in Asia
1
Sports leagues established in 2011
2011 establishments in Nepal